Dior Johnson (born January 28, 2004) is an American college basketball player for the Pittsburgh Panthers of the Atlantic Coast Conference (ACC). In December 2022, he pled guilty to simple assault and strangulation of a woman he had been romantically involved with. He was a consensus four-star recruit and one of the top players in the 2022 class.

Early life
Johnson was born in Kingston, New York, on January 28, 2004. Dior was raised by his single mother and his grandmother.

High school career
Throughout his high school career, Johnson played for 9 high schools in 5 different states.
Johnson started his high school career competing for his hometown Saugerties high school as a 7th and 8th grader. He broke the New York boys basketball state record for the youngest player to reach 1,000 points. After briefly attending IMG Academy in Bradenton, Florida during his freshman year, Johnson returned home to play for Saugerties after sustaining an injury.Later on during his freshman season, he would again transfer to Findlay Prep in Henderson, Nevada. However, Findlay Preps basketball program closed, leaving Johnson to transfer to Hillcrest Prep in Arizona. He eventually left Hillcrest before his sophomore season began, and was initially supposed to play his sophomore season at Fairfax High School in Los Angeles, but ended up playing for Mayfair high school in Lakewood, California alongside five-star recruit Josh Christopher. For his junior season, Johnson transferred to Oak Hill Academy in Mouth of Wilson, Virginia, but left the school after sustaining a leg injury. He then returned to California where he attended Centennial High School in Corona, however he never ended up playing for the huskies. As a senior, Johnson initially attended Prolific Prep in Napa, California before transferring midway through the season to prep powerhouse SoCal Academy.

Recruiting
Johnson is a consensus four-star recruit and one of the top players in the 2022 class. On February 7, 2020, he committed to playing college basketball for Syracuse before decommitting nine months later. On June 22, 2021, he committed to Oregon before decommitting a year later. On June 13, 2022, he committed to Pittsburgh.

Arrest 
Johnson plead guilty to two misdemeanor charges in December 2022 for simple assault and strangulation, stemming from a September 5th incident in the same year where he struck a woman multiple times, causing bruising, and forcing her head into a bed, making it difficult for her to breathe. Johnson was suspended from the Pitt Men's basketball team during this period, but was reinstated after pleading guilty. Johnson was sentenced to a year of probation and required to complete batterer's intervention. Johnson took a redshirt in the 22-23 season as a result.

References

External links 
Pittsburgh Panthers bio

2004 births
Living people
American men's basketball players
Point guards
Basketball players from New York (state)
People from Saugerties, New York